Carl L. Hart (born October 30, 1966) is an American psychologist and neuroscientist,  working as the Mamie Phipps Clark Professor of Psychology (in Psychiatry) at Columbia University. Hart is known for his research on drug abuse and drug addiction, his advocacy for the legalization of recreational drugs, and his recreational use of drugs. Hart is one of the first tenured African American professors of sciences at Columbia University.

Early life and education
Hart grew up in the Carol City neighborhood of Miami Gardens, a suburb of Miami considered one of the most dangerous in the US. As a youth, he engaged in petty crime and the use and sale of drugs, and at times carried a gun. He was also a proficient athlete involved in high school sports. He was raised by a single mother, who separated from an abusive father when Hart was six. After high school, he served in the United States Air Force (1984–1988), which became his path to higher education.

Hart earned a Bachelor of Science degree in psychology from the University of Maryland. He earned a Master of Science (1994) and PhD (1996), both in psychology/neuroscience, from the University of Wyoming. Hart attended University of North Carolina Wilmington, where he worked with his undergraduate neuroscience professor, Robert Hakan, before attending the University of Wyoming. He pursued postdoctoral research at the University of California, San Francisco and Yale University, and completed an Intramural Training Award fellowship at the National Institutes of Health.

Career and research
Hart is the Mamie Phipps Clark Professor of Psychology (in Psychiatry) and former chair of the psychology department at Columbia University. Hart arrived at Columbia in 1998; in 2009, he became one of the university's first tenured African American professors of sciences. His area of expertise is neuropsychopharmacology, with a research focus on the behavioral and neuropharmacological effects of psychoactive drugs in humans. He has a particular interest in the social and psychological factors that influence self-administration of drugs. He is the Principal Investigator at Columbia University's Neuropsychopharmacology Lab.

In 1999, Hart began investigating the effects of crack cocaine on behavior. Through 2009, he received research grants totaling over $6 million, from the National Institute on Drug Abuse.

Hart's research is centered around human subject experiments conducted in his research lab at the New York State Psychiatric Institute (a hospital located in the Columbia University Irving Medical Center). The facility, informally called the ResLab (residential laboratory), accommodated subjects for extended periods; a typical experiment ran for two weeks. The subjects, habitual drug users, were given precisely metered doses of drugs such as marijuana, cocaine, and methamphetamine, while being continuously monitored and tested.

Hart opposes the brain disease model of addiction dominant in the field, which holds that addiction is a brain disorder. Nora Volkow, director of the National Institute on Drug Abuse, states that visible differences in the brains of addicts helps explain the nature of compulsive drug usage. Hart states that most studies show that drug users' cognitive abilities and functions are within the normal range. Commenting on Hart's argument, Anna Lembke, head of the Stanford Addiction Medicine Dual Diagnosis Clinic, said that "intelligent, informed people can disagree on the disease model of addiction", and noted that there is evidence that long-term drug use can alter the brain in a different way than learning a new language or a musical instrument. Hart indicates that the absence of positive outlets and activities is one reason drug use can occur in communities. He argues that drug laws intended to make a society safer should be based on empirical evidence.

Hart is also a Research Fellow and former co-director at Columbia's Institute for Research in African-American Studies.

Books 
Hart has written two books for the general public, High Price and Drug Use for Grown-Ups, and co-authored, with Charles Ksir, recent editions of the introductory textbook, Drugs, Society, and Human Behavior.

High Price

In 2013, Hart published High Price: A Neuroscientist's Journey of Self-Discovery That Challenges Everything You Know About Drugs and Society, described as "combining memoir, popular science, and public policy." In it, Hart discusses misconceptions about illegal drugs, speaking from the combined perspectives of growing up in a poor, crime-ridden African American neighborhood, and his career as a research neuroscientist. He describes his upbringing, time in the military, years in college and grad school, and his journey to a PhD and tenured professorship at Columbia. He discusses the challenge of learning white cultural norms and language as an aspect of succeeding in academia, and then returning to his family and feeling alienated and unable to connect. Using drug crime statistics and details from his lab research, he argues that drugs are a symptom, not the cause, of crime and poverty, and that they mask issues of lack of education, racism, unemployment, and despair. He ends the book with an argument for the decriminalization of drugs, stating that his research has shown that the dangers associated with drugs are largely misunderstood, and that a decrease in stigma and increase in conversation would likely decrease the number of drug related deaths. He advocates for a move to drug policies based on scientific evidence and human rights, not irrational fear and sensationalism.

Drug Use for Grown-Ups
In 2021, Hart published Drug Use for Grown-Ups: Chasing Liberty in the Land of Fear. In the book, and in media interviews around its publication, Hart revealed that he is a recreational heroin user. Hart also indicated that he uses a number of other drugs. He argued that he is not an addict, but that he uses drugs responsibly in the "pursuit of happiness". Hart further argued that for the majority of individuals, recreational use of drugs has a positive effect, and that journalists and researchers overstate the harms of such drug use.

Public debate
Hart states that drug policy in the US and most of the rest of the world "is based on assumption and anecdote, but rarely on scientific evidence". He advocates decriminalizing drug use through policies that are scientifically based rather than heavily influenced by social determinants such as race and class. As an example, he discusses the criminalization of crack cocaine (typically associated with poor communities) and lack of similar criminalization of powder cocaine (traditionally associated with wealthier communities) as an example of how drug criminalization has been based on social problems rather than scientific fact, considering both contain the same active chemical.

Hart states that the poor, crime-ridden environment he grew up in influenced his world view, and he believed that drugs were the reason for poverty and crime in most neighborhoods. Only later, through his research, did he come to believe that "crime and poverty were mostly independent of drug use".

Hart has lectured and testified around the world as an expert on psychoactive drugs. He testified before the United States Congress' Committee On Oversight and Government Reform. He has testified, on the stand and in written submissions, in family courts in New York City, advocating for children to stay with parents who have tested positive for marijuana use, arguing that there is no scientific basis for casual marijuana use having an effect on parenting. In one case, a mother had tested positive while giving birth at a city hospital, and been charged with negligence (the case was later dropped).

In a 2013 New York Times editorial, he commented on the toxicology report presented in the case of Trayvon Martin, where the indication of marijuana in Martin's blood was used as evidence that he might have been paranoid the night of his shooting, causing him to attack Zimmerman. Hart stated that the assertion subscribed to outdated notions of marijuana use, such as those implied in Reefer Madness, and failed to recognize the seven decades of research on marijuana that show the levels of marijuana present in Martin's blood were insufficient to cause the aforementioned side effects, and that the side effects mentioned are extremely uncommon in marijuana users.

In May 2017, speaking at a drug policy conference at the University of the Philippines Diliman, Hart addressed the misconceptions about methamphetamine in the Philippines amidst President Rodrigo Duterte's war on drugs. Citing lab tests on animals, Hart refuted Duterte's claim that methamphetamine shrinks people's brains and causes them to become violent. In the aftermath of his speech, Hart began to receive online death threats which forced him to leave the Philippines shortly thereafter. Duterte commented on Hart's claims, saying: "That's all bullshit to me", and called Hart a "son of a bitch who has gone crazy". In an interview with Public Radio International, Hart described Duterte as "a president making such ignorant comments about drugs — like he's a pharmacologist" and added that Duterte was "out of his league when he talks about drugs".

Media appearances 
Hart has been a speaker at Talks at Google, The Reason Foundation, and The Nobel Conference. He has been interviewed or otherwise featured on CNN, Stossel and "The Independents" on Fox Business, "All In with Chris Hayes" on MSNBC, Reason TV, "The O'Reilly Factor" on Fox News, "Democracy Now!", and The Joe Rogan Experience. He spoke at TEDMED 2014, discussing his evidence-based view of drug addiction, and how that should impact public policy. Hart is featured in the 2012 documentary, The House I Live In, and in the 2021 Netflix documentary, Crack: Cocaine, Corruption & Conspiracy, where he discusses what was missing from the sensationalized portrayal of crack in the 1980s.

Personal life
Hart is married to Robin Hart and has three children. He lives in New York City.

Awards and honors 
 Columbia University: Presidential Award for Outstanding Teaching (2008)
 Mothers Against Teen Violence: Humanitarian Award (2014)
 PEN/E. O. Wilson Literary Science Writing Award for High Price: A Neuroscientist's Journey of Self-Discovery That Challenges Everything You Know About Drugs and Society (2014)
 City of Miami: Dr. Carl Hart Day (Feb 1, 2016)

Bibliography 
Selected articles, essays and research papers:

References

External links

 
 

1966 births
African-American educators
African-American scientists
American academic administrators
American neuroscientists
Columbia University faculty
American drug policy reform activists
Living people
University of Maryland, College Park alumni
University of Wyoming alumni
Writers on addiction
21st-century African-American people
20th-century African-American people